This is a list of video games developed by Ubisoft Montreal.

List

1998–2008

2009–present

References

Ubisoft games
Ubisoft Montreal